Sheykh Hasan or Shaikh Hasan or Sheikh Hasan may refer to:
 Sheykh Hasan, Alborz
 Sheykh Hasan, East Azerbaijan
 Sheykh Hasan, Kermanshah
 Sheykh Hasan, Sarpol-e Zahab, Kermanshah Province
 Sheykh Hasan, Khuzestan